Fall from Grace is a live album by the American thrash metal band Death Angel, released in 1990. Due to label changes, the album was released without input from the band and new label Geffen Records, hence the lack of the band's trademark logo on the artwork.

Despite being referred to as an official release, the members of Death Angel have stated in interviews that they did not know of this album until they saw a copy of it in a record store in Arizona, just prior to the band's near-fatal bus accident.

Track listing 
"Evil Priest" (Cavestany, Osegueda) – 5:46
"Why You Do This" (Cavestany, Osegueda) – 6:05
"Mistress of Pain" (Cavestany) – 4:26
"Road Mutants" (Cavestany, Pepa) – 4:01
"Voracious Souls" (Cavestany, Osegueda) – 6:28
"Confused" (Cavestany, Pepa) – 7:00
"Bored" (Cavestany) – 3:28
"Kill as One" (Cavestany) – 6:28
"Guilty of Innocence" (Cavestany) – 4:36
"Shores of Sin" (Cavestany, Pepa, Vain) – 5:12
"Final Death" (Cavestany) – 7:00

Personnel 
Death Angel
Mark Osegueda – vocals
Rob Cavestany – guitars
Gus Pepa – guitars
Dennis Pepa – bass
Andy Galeon – drums

Production
Edward Ka-Spel – producer

References 

Death Angel albums
1990 live albums
Live thrash metal albums
Enigma Records live albums